Grundig is a German consumer electronics manufacturer owned by the Turkish Arçelik A.Ş., the white goods (major appliance) manufacturer of Turkish conglomerate Koç Holding. The company made domestic appliances and personal-care products.

Originally a German consumer electronic company, Grundig GmbH was founded in 1945 by Max Grundig and eventually headquartered in Nuremberg. It grew to become one of the leading radio, TV, recorder and other electronics goods manufacturers of Europe in the following decades of the 20th century. In the 1970s, Philips began acquiring Grundig AG's shares, leading to complete control in 1993. In 1998, Philips divested Grundig. In 2007, Koç Holding bought Grundig and put the brand under its home-appliances subsidiary Arcelik A.Ş. Koç is a publicly listed conglomerate with more than 80,000 employees.

History

Grundig began in 1945 with the establishment of a store named Fürth, Grundig & Wurzer (RVF), which sold radios and was headquartered in Fürth, northern Bavaria. After the Second World War, Max Grundig recognized the need for radios in Germany, and in 1947 produced a kit, while a factory and administration centre were built at Fürth. In 1951, the first television sets were manufactured at the new facility. At the time Grundig was the largest radio manufacturer in Europe. Divisions in Nuremberg, Frankfurt and Karlsruhe were established.

In 2013, Grundig launched its home appliances (white goods) product range, becoming one of the mainstream manufacturers in Europe. Parent Arcelik A.Ş., has more than 27,000 employees worldwide. Grundig has manufacturing plants in several European cities that deliver Grundig products to more than 65 countries around the world.

1940s
Grundig started as a typical German company in 1945. Its early notability was due to Grundig radio. Max Grundig, a radio dealer, built a machine called "Heinzelmann", which was a radio that came without thermionic valves and as a DIY kit to circumvent post war rules. The first of the same was named the 'Weltklang'.

1950s
Based on Heinzelmann success, Grundig started a factory. This allowed the company to start Grundig TV. This was created for the first German television channel which started in 1952. The company then developed a portable tape recorder and The Grundig Television Receiver 210.

In 1955, the American firm of Wilcox-Gay began importing Grundig radios into the U.S., using its Majestic Radio dealer network to distribute the German company's products. The marketing of "Majestic-Grundig" radios continued until Wilcox-Gay went out of business at the end of 1961.

1960s
A plant was opened in 1960 to manufacture tape recorders in Belfast, Northern Ireland, the first production by Grundig outside Germany. The managing director of the plant, Thomas Niedermayer, was kidnapped and later killed by the Provisional IRA in December 1973. The factory was closed with the loss of around 1000 jobs in 1980.

1970s
In 1972, Grundig GmbH became Grundig AG. After this Philips began to gradually accumulate shares in the company over the years, and assumed complete economic control in 1993. Grundig pulled out of this partnership in 1998 owing to unsatisfactory performance and the decline in Philips consumer electronics presence around the world.

1980s
Germany's first colour television projector was started by Grundig in 1981. The next year, the second generation electronic notepad was developed and marketed. Philips increased its stake in the company and Max Grundig no longer controlled business management in 1984.

1990s
In 1991, Grundig entered the telephony equipment market starting with its cordless telephone. In 1993, the Grundig TV was based on a 16:9 picture format for signal transmission. In 1995 and 1996, the company included 3-D sound systems, TVs, satellite receivers and other initiatives that included interactive user guidance. However, Philips ended its stake in the company by 1997-8.

2000s
At the end of June 2000 the company relocated its headquarters in Fürth to Nuremberg-Langwasser. Grundig had a turnover of €1.281 billion the following year. In autumn 2002, Grundig's banks did not extend the company's lines of credit, leaving the company with an April 2003 deadline to announce insolvency. Grundig AG declared bankruptcy in 2003. In 2004 Britain's Alba plc and the Turkish Koç's Beko jointly took over Grundig Home InterMedia System, Grundig's consumer electronics division. In 2007 Alba sold its half of the business to Koç for US$50.3 million, although it retained the license to use the Grundig brand in the UK until 2010, and in Australasia until 2012.

In 2007 Grundig Mobile announced the U900 Linux-based mobile phone.

At the end of 2007 Turkey's Koç Holding took full ownership of Grundig Multimedia, the parent company of Grundig Intermedia GmbH in Nuremberg.

2010s
The company continued on to entertainment electronics, electrical, and home appliances. Eventually, the company entered the white goods sector in 2013, thus becoming the EU's only consumer electronics company covering the full range.

Present
Grundig's headquarters are in Frankfurt, Germany. Worldwide, the Grundig company employs an additional 1,600 people in production, R&D and sales. Grundig designs products aiming for the highest energy conservation. The company is organized into three product groups – consumer electronics, small domestic appliances and large household appliances.

Sponsorship 
Grundig became the first official technology partner of the German Bundesliga in 2011. In addition to that, the Nuremberg football stadium was called Grundig Stadium until the end of 2015. Grundig continued its German Bundesliga Official Technology Partnership in 2014. The Grundig logo was a permanent display item during all Bundesliga and Bundesliga 2 broadcasts from 2012/13 until 2014/15.

Grundig is also the name sponsor of the Norwegian Women's and Men's Handball Leagues.

Furthermore, Grundig continued its sponsorship with Fenerbahçe's women's and men's volleyball teams, and sponsored many international golf tournaments in 2014.

Grundig launched the Respect Food initiative with the goal of underlining the seriousness of the food waste problem to reduce global food waste which is the second topic of the UN's 2030 sustainable development goals.

Products 
Grundig offers household appliances and electronic goods.

 Television: Grundig offers a wide range of LED televisions.
 Radio: Grundig produced several ranges of transistor radios. These included the small portable "Yacht Boy" radios for mariners, with FM, LW, MW, and up to 12 SW bands for worldwide coverage. The Satellit range radios were the most robust and sophisticated of the Grundig radio range.
 Audio: Grundig audiovisual product range offers HIFI Systems, soundbars and Bluetooth speakers.
 Home appliances: manufactured by Grundig include fridges, freezers, ovens, stoves, hobs, hoods, microwaves, warming drawers, washing machines and dryers. Grundig's small domestic appliances include coffee machines, toasters, tea makers, kettles, mixers, blenders, other kitchen helpers, dishwashers, steam irons and vacuum cleaners.
 Personal care products: Grundig extended its product range and offers hair dryers, hair stylers, shavers, body scales, foot massagers, manicure and pedicure sets, toothbrushes, facial saunas and ultrasonic cleaners.

See also
Grundig Business Systems
Video Compact Cassette - VP-100 VTR

References

External links

Official Grundig AG website
AAGF Amicale des Anciens de Grundig France 
Grundig Radio Boy — History of Grundig, 1945–1997

Electronics companies of Germany
Audio equipment manufacturers of Germany
Home appliance brands
2007 mergers and acquisitions
Defunct manufacturing companies of Germany
Manufacturing companies established in 1930
Manufacturing companies disestablished in 2003
Manufacturing companies based in Nuremberg
German companies disestablished in 2003
German companies established in 1930
German subsidiaries of foreign companies
Radio manufacturers